James Stewart Parker (20 October 1941 – 2 November 1988) was a Northern Irish poet and playwright.

Biography
He was born in Sydenham, Belfast, of a Protestant working-class family. His birthplace is marked by an Ulster History Circle blue plaque. While still in his teens, he contracted bone cancer and had a leg amputated. He studied for an MA in Poetic Drama at Queen's University, Belfast, on a scholarship, before commencing teaching in the United States at Hamilton College and Cornell University.

Parker was a member of a group of young writers that included Seamus Heaney and Bernard MacLaverty in the early 1960s at Queen's University in Belfast. In British Poetry since 1945, Edward Lucie-Smith calls him "a rawer, rougher, more unformed poet than either of the other two Belfast poets presented here" (i.e. Seamus Heaney and Derek Mahon). He notes that all three are post-Movement and neo-Georgian, owing little to William Butler Yeats and not much more to Patrick Kavanagh.

Following his return to Northern Ireland he worked as a freelance writer, contributing a column on pop music to The Irish Times. He later moved to Great Britain, where he wrote for radio, television and the stage. The musical landscape of Belfast is integral to his work as a playwright. One could arguably call him the Van Morrison of Irish theatre. He would have been honoured by the title, as Van Morrison was one of his favourite artists.

Parker died of stomach cancer in London on 2 November 1988.

Work
His plays include Spokesong (1975), a musical Kingdom Come (1977), Catchpenny Twist (1977), Nightshade (1979), Pratt's Fall (1981), The Kamikaze Ground Staff Reunion Dinner (radio 1979, filmed 1981),  Northern Star (1984), Heavenly Bodies (1986) and Pentecost (1987).

The 1979 BBC Radio 4 production of The Kamikaze Ground Staff Reunion Dinner featured John le Mesurier, among others.

The stage plays are published by Methuen Drama. Stewart Parker: Plays 1 (2000) includes Spokesong, Catchpenny Twist, Nightshade and Pratt's Fall. Stewart Parker: Plays 2 (2000) includes Northern Star, Heavenly Bodies and Pentecost.

An annual award (The Stewart Parker Trust Award) for best Irish debut play was set up in his name after his death. There is a cash bursary as part of the award. Previous recipients of the award include: Conor McPherson, Mark O'Rowe, Enda Walsh, Eugene O'Brien, Gerald Murphy, Lisa McGee and Christian O'Reilly.

Several new publications appeared in 2008, the twentieth anniversary of Parker's death. These include:
 
 A collection of Parker's articles on popular music for The Irish Times entitled High Pop: Irish Times Column 1970–1976, edited by Gerald Dawe and Maria Johnston (Belfast: Lagan, 2008) 
 A collection of Parker's reviews and articles on culture, entitled Dramatis Personae and Other Writings, edited by Gerald Dawe, Maria Johnston and Clare Wallace (Prague: Litteraria Pragensia, 2008) 
 A collection of Parker's plays for television, entitled Stewart Parker: Television Plays, edited by Clare Wallace (Prague: Litteraria Pragensia, 2008) . The plays included are this collection are: Lost Belongings; Radio Pictures; Blue Money; Iris in the Traffic, Ruby in the Rain; Joyce in June; and I’m a Dreamer, Montreal.

I’m a Dreamer, Montreal
Parker's play I’m a Dreamer, Montreal won the Christopher Ewart-Biggs Memorial Prize. It was commissioned by BBC Radio 3 in April 1975 and televised for ITV Playhouse in March 1979.

In Belfast, where the play is set, music librarian Nelson Gloverby (Bryan Murray) lives in a dream world. A showband singer by night, he is unconcerned with his audience's irritation at his inability to stick to the proper lyrics. He is innocently drawn into the brutality of the Troubles when he meets siren Sandra Carse (Jeananne Crowley). His world having been turned around, he takes the bus home. The bus driver is singing the lyrics "I'm a dreamer, Montreal"; however, this time it is Nelson who points out the correct lyrics: "I’m a Dreamer, Aren't We All?"

References

External links

Irish Playography entry
Lagan Press
Litteraria Pragensia Books
Stewart Parker Trust website
Stewart Parker's radio plays
Dictionary of Ulster Biography entry

1941 births
1988 deaths
20th-century British dramatists and playwrights
20th-century British male writers
20th-century poets from Northern Ireland
20th-century writers from Northern Ireland
Alumni of Queen's University Belfast
British amputees
Christopher Ewart-Biggs Memorial Prize recipients
Cornell University people
Deaths from cancer in England
Deaths from stomach cancer
Male dramatists and playwrights from Northern Ireland
Male poets from Northern Ireland
Male writers from Northern Ireland
People educated at Ashfield Boys' High School
Writers from Belfast